Guyana Airways was the flag carrier of Guyana. It was an important link for the Guyanese community as it provided a way into and out of the country. During its operations, Guyana Airways operated services to destinations in the Caribbean, the United States and Canada. The airline was headquartered in Georgetown, Guyana. It was declared insolvent in 2001.

History

The company was founded by Art J. Williams and Harry Wendt in 1939 as British Guiana Airways using Ireland flying boats. Although it was a private venture, the colonial government provided subsidies. In the 1940s, the company began operating with the Grumman G-21 Goose. In July 1955, the colonial government bought BGA. At this time, BWIA West Indies Airways provided management assistance. In September 1963, the name was shortened to Guyana Airways. In May 1966, Guyana became an independent nation. The airline leased all of its aircraft, which resulted in many different aircraft types being flown during the airline's existence, such as Russian-made Tupolev and American Boeing jets. 

In June 1999, the airline went bankrupt and ceased operations. However, a new company named Guyana Air 2000 was formed using its assets, and maintained a short-lived operation until May 2001 when it filed for insolvency.

Destinations

International routes in 1981
According to the April 26, 1981 Guyana Airways international service timetable, the airline was operating Boeing 737-200 jet flights between Georgetown Timehri Airport (GEO, now Cheddi Jagan International Airport) and the following international destinations:

Bridgetown, Barbados (BGI)
Miami (MIA)
Paramaribo (PBM) 
Port of Spain (POS)

International routes in 1983
According to the July 1, 1983 edition of the Official Airline Guide (OAG), Guyana Airways was serving the following international and domestic destinations from Georgetown (GEO):

International destinations served with the Boeing 707:

Bridgetown, Barbados (BGI)
Miami (MIA)
New York City (JFK)
Paramaribo (PBM)
Port of Spain (POS)
Boa Vista (BVB)

Domestic destinations in Guyana served with de Havilland DHC-6 Twin Otter and Hawker Siddeley HS 748 turboprops:

Annai (NAI)
Bartica (GFO)
Bemichi (BCG)
Ekereku (EKE)
Imbaimadai (IMB)
Kamarang (KAR)
Kurupung (KPG)
Lethem (LTM)
Mabaruma (USI)
Mahdia (MHA)
Matthews Ridge (MWJ)

Fleet

Guyana Airways operated the following aircraft types during its existence:

Accidents and incidents
On December 3, 1973, a de Havilland Canada DHC-6 Twin Otter (registered 8R-GCP) crashed into a mountain while descending at Kurupung, Cuyuni-Mazaruni. Only one of the four passengers survived.

On November 30, 1981, a Douglas DC-6 (registered N3486F) caught fire after an engine failure when taking off at George F. L. Charles Airport. The aircraft crashed near the airport, bursting into flames. All 3 crew members were killed.

See also
List of defunct airlines of Guyana

References

External links

Defunct airlines of Guyana
Airlines established in 1939
Airlines disestablished in 2001
1939 establishments in British Guiana
2001 disestablishments in Guyana
British Guiana in World War II